The 1970–71 Danish 1. division season was the 14th season of ice hockey in Denmark. Ten teams participated in the league, and Gladsaxe SF won the championship. Hvidovre Ishockey was relegated.

Regular season

External links
Season on eliteprospects.com

Danish
1970 in Danish sport
1971 in Danish sport